Gilbert Tilus Jr. (born 28 October 1998) is a Turks and Caicos Islander footballer who plays as a right back and goalkeeper for AFC Academy and the Turks and Caicos Islands national football team.

Career

International
Tilus made his senior international debut on 22 March 2018 in a 4-0 friendly defeat to the Dominican Republic.

References

External links

1998 births
Living people
Turks and Caicos Islands footballers
Turks and Caicos Islands international footballers
Association football defenders
Association football goalkeepers
AFC Academy players